Jari Räsänen (born 28 January 1966) is a Finnish former cross-country skier who competed from 1988 to 1998. He won two bronze medals in the 4 × 10 km relay at the Winter Olympics (1992, 1994).

Räsänen also won four 4 × 10 km relay medals at the FIS Nordic World Ski Championships with three silvers (1989, 1995, 1997) and a bronze (1991). He also won two FIS races at 10 km, one in 1994 and the other in 1995 (Both in Finland).

Cross-country skiing results
All results are sourced from the International Ski Federation (FIS).

Olympic Games
 2 medals – (2 bronze)

World Championships
 4 medals – (3 silver, 1 bronze)

World Cup

Season standings

Team podiums
 1 victory – (1 )
 10 podiums – (9 , 1 )

Note:  Until the 1999 World Championships and the 1994 Olympics, World Championship and Olympic races were included in the World Cup scoring system.

References

External links 
 
 
 

1966 births
Living people
People from Maaninka
Cross-country skiers at the 1988 Winter Olympics
Cross-country skiers at the 1992 Winter Olympics
Cross-country skiers at the 1994 Winter Olympics
Finnish male cross-country skiers
Olympic medalists in cross-country skiing
FIS Nordic World Ski Championships medalists in cross-country skiing
Medalists at the 1992 Winter Olympics
Medalists at the 1994 Winter Olympics
Olympic bronze medalists for Finland
Olympic cross-country skiers of Finland
Sportspeople from North Savo
20th-century Finnish people